Charles Warren (1840–1927) was a British Army officer and head of the London Metropolitan Police.

Charles Warren may also refer to:

 Charles Warren (California politician) (1927–2019), California State Assemblyman and chairman of the Council on Environmental Quality
 Charles Warren (engraver) (1762–1823), English line engraver
 Charles Warren (golfer) (born 1975), American golfer
 Charles Warren (U.S. author) (1868–1954), American legal historian, winner of the Pulitzer Prize
 Charles B. Warren (1870–1936), American diplomat and politician
 C. E. T. Warren (1912–1988), British author and Second World War Royal Navy submariner 
 Charles Hyde Warren (1877–1950), American geologist
 Charles Marquis Warren (1912–1990), American film director, writer and producer
 Charles R. Warren, American schoolteacher
 Charles Warren (MP) (1764–1829), English barrister and politician, judge and amateur cricketer
 Charles Warren (cricketer, born 1843) (1843–1919), English clergyman and cricketer
 Charles Henry Warren (1798–1874), Massachusetts attorney, politician and judge
 Charles Howard Warren (1856–1935), American railroad and insurance executive
 Charles E. Warren (1962–2005), professor of biochemistry and molecular biology
 C. Denier Warren, Anglo-American actor

See also